Xyroptila africana is a moth of the family Pterophoridae. It is known from the Democratic Republic of Congo and Ghana.

References

africana
Insects of the Democratic Republic of the Congo
Insects of West Africa
Moths of Africa
Moths described in 1969